Berend Veneberg (born 5 November 1963 in Den Ham) is a former strongman and powerlifter from the Netherlands.  He finished 5th at the World's Strongest Man games in 1993, 9th in 1998, 6th in 1999, 1st at Europe's Strongest Man in 2000 and won Strongest man of the Netherlands 7 times.

Biography 
Veneberg was born in Den Ham, Overijssel. He managed his first podium finish at the Strongest man of the Netherlands in 1991 where he finished third behind Ted van der Parre and Wout Zijlstra. The next year he placed second behind Ted van der Parre. In 1993 he would win the tournament for the first time a feat he would repeat six times. The same year he was invited for the first time at the World's Strongest Man in which he finished fifth. He competed several more times the following years and reached the final of the tournament on two more occasions. In 1998 he was injured in the final and finished ninth. In 1999 he competed for the last time and finished sixth. Veneberg competed together with Wout Zijlstra on several occasions in the World's Strongest Team competition and won the tournament in 1998. After this they reached the podium several more times but did not win again. In 2000 Veneberg won Europe's Strongest Man. Berend has won the Dutch National Powerlifting Championships 6 times. He also runs his own gym in the Netherlands, and has trained some top strongmen such as Jarno Hams. Berend competed on American Gladiators.

Honours
1st place Strongest man of the Netherlands (1993)
5th place World's Strongest Man  (1993)
1st place Strongest man of the Netherlands (1995)
1st place Strongest man of the Netherlands (1996)
1st place Strongest man of the Netherlands (1998)
9th place World's Strongest Man  (1998)
1st place Strongest man of the Netherlands (1999)
6th place World's Strongest Man  (1999)
1st place Strongest man of the Netherlands (2000)
1st place Europe's Strongest Man (2000)
1st place Strongest man of the Netherlands (2002)
1st place World's Strongest Team (1998)

References

External links
Berend Veneberg on realdutchpower.nl 

1963 births
Living people
Dutch strength athletes
People from Den Ham
American Gladiators contestants
Sportspeople from Overijssel